Bohumil Jauris (30 August 1933 – 1992) was a Czech speed skater. He competed in three events at the 1956 Winter Olympics.

References

External links
 

1933 births
1992 deaths
Czech male speed skaters
Olympic speed skaters of Czechoslovakia
Speed skaters at the 1956 Winter Olympics
Place of birth missing